The Neuilly-sur-Seine Old Communal Cemetery in the Hauts-de-Seine département of France is in the western suburbs of Paris, between Paris and La Défense.

The first is called cimetière ancien (Old Cemetery) and is to be found in Neuilly; the second (New Cemetery) is to be found in Nanterre, near La Défense and adjacent to Paris La Défense Arena, but belongs to Neuilly. It is called cimetière nouveau.

Notable interments

Old Cemetery
 Alessandro Anzani (1877–1956), inventor
 Liliane Bettencourt (1922–2017), principal shareholder L'Oréal
 Henri Betti (1917–2005), composer and pianist
 Louis de Broglie (1892–1987), Nobel Prize Laureate in science
 René Clair (1898–1981), film director
 Pierre Drieu La Rochelle (1893–1945), writer
 Anatole France (1844–1924), novelist
 Pierre Fresnay (1897–1975), actor
 Alexander Glazunov (1865–1936), composer

 André Maurois (1885–1967), writer
 Antonia "La Argentina" Mercé (1890–1936), dancer
 Paul Meurisse (1912–1979), actor
 Pierre Mondy (1925–2012), actor

 Yvonne Printemps (1894–1977), actress and singer
 Pierre Puvis de Chavannes (1824–1898), painter
 Jane Rhodes (1929–2011), operatic soprano
 Alain Robbe-Grillet (1922-2018) author, filmmaker, member of the Académie Française
 Countess Iréne Sampieri (1872–1963), socialite
 Michel Serrault (1928–2007), actor

The cemetery contains one Commonwealth war grave, of a British Red Cross Society officer of World War I.

New Cemetery
 Grégoire Aslan (1908–1982), actor
 Wassily Kandinsky (1866–1944), painter

The cemetery contains 33 Commonwealth war graves, of 32 service personnel from World War I and one from World War II, as well as an American Legion memorial bearing the names of 250 Americans.

References

External links
 
 Adapted from the article Neuilly-sur-Seine community cemetery, from Wikinfo, licensed under the GNU Free Documentation License.

Cemeteries in Hauts-de-Seine
Commonwealth War Graves Commission cemeteries in France